Pronto is a bus route that runs between Chesterfield and Nottingham via Mansfield.

History 
The "Pronto" brand was launched in the mid-2000s and was shared by Stagecoach East Midlands and Trent Barton who both operated the route. Some tickets issued by the two companies were valid on all services, while others were only accepted on services operated by one company.

In 2012, there was a dispute between the two operators resulting in Stagecoach timing its services to run five minutes before the Trent Barton services. It was short-lived, and consistent headways were restored.

In June 2018, Stagecoach introduced eleven new double-decker buses on the route.

In February 2020, Trent Barton withdrew from the route, leaving Stagecoach East Midlands as the sole operator.

Route
The route operates between Chesterfield and Nottingham via Mansfield. From Monday to Saturday between Chesterfield and Mansfield, the service is half-hourly, while between Mansfield and Nottingham the service operates every 15 minutes. On Sundays the service runs hourly from Chesterfield to Mansfield, and half-hourly between Mansfield and Nottingham.

Incident
In October 2019, three buses in a row failed to pick up a wheelchair user who was waiting at a bus stop in Mansfield. Following a complaint, Stagecoach apologised and stated that two of its drivers would face disciplinary action.

References

External links

Bus routes in England
Transport in Nottinghamshire
Transport in Derbyshire